Diego Alfonso Valdés Contreras (born 30 January 1994) is a Chilean professional footballer who plays as an attacking midfielder for Liga MX club América and the Chile national team.

Club career

Audax Italiano
He made his professional debut in 2012, in a match against Universidad Católica for the Chilean Primera División.

Morelia
Valdés joined Monarcas Morelia from Audax Italiano on June 14, 2016, on a two million dollar move. Valdés made his debut on July 15, 2016, against Club Tijuana losing 2–0.

International career
Valdés was expected to play for the Chile national under-20 football team in the 2013 South American Youth Championship in Argentina. However, he was left out of the team at the last minute by manager Mario Salas.

The team's performance in Argentina qualified them for a place in the Turkey 2013 under-20 World Cup and when team member Diego Rojas was injured and unable to play, Valdés was selected to take his place.

He got his first call up to the senior Chile squad for a friendly against the United States in January 2015 and made his international debut in the match.

International goals
Scores and results list Chile's goal tally first.

Racism controversy

On September 10, 2018, a day before a friendly match between Chile and South Korea, Valdés made a racist gesture, slanting his eyes with his hands at a fan publicity event. The gesture was reported internationally and created furor in Korea, resulting in Valdes posting an apology widely seen as inadequate. This was the second racist incident in Korea from a visiting South American team, following a similar incident in 2017 in which Colombian football player Edwin Cardona was banned for five games by FIFA after making a similar gesture.

Honours
Individual
Liga MX Best XI: Apertura 2021, Clausura 2022
Liga MX All-Star: 2021

References

External links
 
 
 
 

1994 births
Living people
People from Puente Alto
Chilean footballers
Footballers from Santiago
Chile under-20 international footballers
Chile international footballers
Chilean expatriate footballers
Audax Italiano footballers
Atlético Morelia players
Santos Laguna footballers
Club América footballers
Chilean Primera División players
Liga MX players
Chilean expatriate sportspeople in Mexico
Expatriate footballers in Mexico
Association football midfielders
2019 Copa América players